Richard Felix Raine Barker (7 May 1917 – 11 July 1997) was an English journalist, drama critic and historian. He is known for having been the youngest dramatic critic on Fleet Street.

Biography
Barker was born in London on 7 May 1917, the son of architect Anthony Raine Barker and his wife, photographer Patricia Russell. He was educated at Felsted School before attending the Choate School in Connecticut as part of a student exchange program.  He married Anthea Francis Gotch in 1950. Felix Barker died on 11 July 1997.

Career
Barker began his career in his late teens reporting  for the Evening News. Two well-received pieces, one on school life and the other on the 1936 Crystal Palace fire, earned him a weekly column as the paper's amateur drama critic at the age of 19, making him the youngest dramatic critic working on Fleet Street. During World War II he served as private and later a sergeant in the Gordon Highlanders where he helped run the theatrical entertainment group, the Balmorals. After the war he rejoined the Evening News, becoming a feature writer in 1946, the deputy drama critic later that same year, and the chief critic in 1958.

In 1960, Barker expanded his work to include film criticism, making him one of the few critics at the time who was working in both theatre and film. He became the president of The Critics' Circle in 1974. Throughout his career as a critic, Barker also established himself as an author and historian, publishing such works as The Oliviers (1953), The House that Stoll Built (1957), London: 2000 Years of a City and its People (1974, with Peter Jackson), London as it Might Have Been (1975, with Ralph Hyde), and The History of London in Maps (1990, with Peter Jackson). His final book was Edwardian London, published in 1995. A posthumous publication was issued by the London Topographical Society, numbered 167, which represented another important collaboration with artist Peter Jackson, entitled The Pleasures of London (2008), and edited by Ann Saunders and Denise Silvester-Carr.

In retirement he lived in Benenden in Kent where he landscaped the grounds of the 15th century Wealden Hall house his father Anthony Raine Barker had extensively restored from the 1930s. He had two children, Kent Barker (1953–) and Maxine Barker (1956–1992).

References

1917 births
1997 deaths
People educated at Felsted School
British theatre critics
English film critics
Choate Rosemary Hall alumni
20th-century English male writers
Writers from London
20th-century English historians
20th-century British journalists
People from Benenden
Presidents of the Critics' Circle
British Army personnel of World War II
Gordon Highlanders soldiers